Nikola Karakolev (born August 24, 1987) is a Macedonian professional basketball shooting guard for EuroNickel 2005.

External links

References

1987 births
Living people
Macedonian men's basketball players
Shooting guards
Sportspeople from Kumanovo